Lawrence Zámbó de Mezőlak (died May 1402) was a Hungarian medieval cleric and Canon law jurist, who served as Provost of the St. Martin's Cathedral in Pressburg (today Bratislava, Slovakia) between 1383 and 1402.

Life
As the son of Martin, he was a member of the Zámbó family which belonged to the kindred Pápa. His uncle was the influential royal treasurer and judge Nicholas Zámbó. Lawrence and his elder brother John also took the Zámbó surname after their uncle. Lawrence was first mentioned by contemporary records in 1374. He attended the University of Prague in 1383, then the University of Vienna in 1384, when he already held the position of provost. In Prague, he studied at the Faculty of Law, where he copied numerous legal texts, adapting them to Hungarian conditions. These works now are preserved by the Rare Books and Early Manuscripts at the Harvard Law School.

During his term as Provost of Pressburg, he had several jurisdictional conflicts and disputes with the vicar of the nominal supervisional Archdiocese of Esztergom, the local Cathedral Chapter of Pressburg, and with the canons from the surrounding areas. He was the last provost in Pressburg who was appointed as a candidate of a Pope.

References

Sources

1402 deaths
Charles University alumni
University of Vienna alumni
14th-century Hungarian Roman Catholic priests
Lawrence